A number of ships have been named Helsingfors, including

References

Ship names